Sugar Loaf Island (old spelling: Ũmánaq) is a small, uninhabited island in Avannaata municipality in northwestern Greenland. Its name means "heart-shaped" in the Greenlandic language. The island is an important landmark in the region often afflicted by fog, and is used for coastal boat navigation.

Geography 
Sugar Loaf Island is located in the north-central part of Upernavik Archipelago, in the group between Kangerlussuaq Icefjord in the south, and Nuussuaq Peninsula in the north. The waters around the island are those of its namesake, the Sugar Loaf Bay, an indentation of Baffin Bay.

References 

Uninhabited islands of Greenland
Sugar Loaf Bay
Islands of the Upernavik Archipelago